Regents College is one of the eight residential colleges of Murray State University in Kentucky.  The college was established in the fall of 1996 when Murray State became the first public university in the United States to establish a campus-wide residential college system. Regents College is named in honor of the outstanding citizens who have served on Murray State University's Board of Regents.

Regents Hall
Regents Hall was dedicated on November 14, 1970. It is named for all those who have served on the Board of Regents of Murray State. The ten story dormitory was designed to house 392 women, and it was built at a cost of $2,333,765. A plaque in the lobby lists the names and dates of service of 51 Regents who had served or were serving at the time the building was dedicated.

Resident Advisors

Intramural sports
The current athletic directors is Alex Saal (Male AD) & Bridget Klohr (Female AD).  Together they work to coordinate the intramural sports for the residents of Regents. These sports include but are not limited to basketball, volleyball, soccer, and flag football.

College Heads

The Regents College Head acts as an advisor to the Regents College Council.  Regina Hudspeth is the acting College Head of Regents College.

Residential College Council

The Residential College Council (RCC) is made up a number of residents of Regents College who are actively involved with the inner workings of the residential college. There are a number of positions on the council such as president and vice president, but any resident is welcome to attend the meetings at 8:45 pm in the Regents lobby.

References

External links
Murray State University: Regent's College Website

University and college dormitories in the United States
Murray State University